Miss World Switzerland is a Beauty pageant in Switzerland for Miss World pageant.

History
Switzerland debut at Miss World pageant in 1952 by Miss Switzerland Organization. In 2005 is the last participation of the pageant to send the official representative at the Miss World pageant. In 2006–2012, Switzerland absent at Miss World pageant, due to problem in license, nobody took the license before.

In 2013, developed by new organization of Miss World Switzerland, Veeranda Aeberli is a National Director of Miss World Switzerland and She organized a National pageant in 2013 "Miss World Switzerland " The return of Switzerland to Miss World. The pageant focused to organize the official pageant for Miss World who focused in the mission BEAUTY WITH A PURPOSE. Since that year, Miss World Switzerland became the national franchise holder of Miss World in Switzerland.

Titleholders
The winner of Miss World Switzerland represents her country at Miss World. On occasion, when the winner does not qualify (due to age) for either contest, a runner-up is sent. Before, the winner was selected or handpicked in another local pageant in the country.

Color key

See also
 Miss Switzerland

References

External links
 Official website
 Official page

Miss
Swiss awards
Beauty pageants in Switzerland